Quintin William Francis Twiss (13 March 1835 – 7 August 1900) was an English first-class cricketer and actor.

The son of the politician Horace Twiss, he was born at Westminster in March 1835. Twiss was educated at Westminster School, before going up to Christ Church, Oxford. While at Oxford he developed an interest in acting and was known to Lewis Carroll, three years his senior. After graduating from Oxford, he became a clerk at the Treasury, though he maintained his status as a well known amateur actor by performing in numerous stage productions. He appeared in first-class cricket for the Gentlemen of England against the Gentlemen of Kent and Sussex at Canterbury in 1857. Batting twice in the match, he was dismissed in the Gentlemen of England's first-innings without scoring by South Norton, while in their second-innings he was dismissed for 4 runs by the same bowler. Twiss died at Westminster in August 1900. His extended family included his grandmother, the actress Frances Kemble, and his grandfather Francis Twiss.

References

External links

1835 births
1900 deaths
People from Westminster
People educated at Westminster School, London
Alumni of Christ Church, Oxford
English male stage actors
English civil servants
English cricketers
Gentlemen of England cricketers